Bassano Health Centre is a medical facility located in Bassano, Alberta, Canada.

Alberta Health Services is responsible for the operations of the hospital.  It services the County of Newell along with Brooks Health Centre.

The hospital contains four acute care beds, one palliative care bed, eight continuing care beds and one respite care bed. It is staffed by two on-site physicians and two nurses.

Charitable funding is provided by the Bassano and District Health Foundation.

Services
Emergency department
Diagnostic imaging (x-ray on site; CT, MRI and ultrasound available at larger facilities in Alberta)
Inpatient medical care
Long-term care
Laboratory services
Physical therapy
Respiratory therapy (visiting)

References 

Hospitals in Alberta
Certified airports in Alberta
Heliports in Canada